Myint Aung may refer to:
 Myint Aung (director) (1931–1996), Burmese film director and film actor
 Myint Aung (MP) (born 1959), Burmese politician and political prisoner
 Myint Aung (minister), Burmese Minister of Mines
 Zeyar Lynn (b. 1958), Burmese poet